A morpheme is the smallest meaningful constituent of a linguistic expression. The field of linguistic study dedicated to morphemes is called morphology. 

In English, morphemes are often but not necessarily words. Morphemes that stand alone are considered roots (such as the morpheme cat); other morphemes, called affixes, are found only in combination with other morphemes. For example, the -s in cats indicates the concept of plurality but is always bound to another concept to indicate a specific kind of plurality. 

This distinction is not universal and does not apply to, for example, Latin, in which many roots cannot stand alone. For instance, the Latin root reg- (‘king’) must always be suffixed with a case marker: rex (reg-s), reg-is, reg-i, etc. For a language like Latin, a root can be defined as the main lexical morpheme of a word.

These sample English words have the following morphological analyses:
 "Unbreakable" is composed of three morphemes: un- (a bound morpheme signifying "not"), break (the root, a free morpheme), and -able (a bound morpheme signifying "an ability to be done").

Classification

Free and bound morphemes

Every morpheme can be classified as free or bound:
 Free morphemes can function independently as words (e.g. town, dog) and can appear within lexemes (e.g. town hall, doghouse).
 Bound morphemes appear only as parts of words, always in conjunction with a root and sometimes with other bound morphemes. For example, un- appears only when accompanied by other morphemes to form a word. Most bound morphemes in English are affixes, specifically prefixes and suffixes. Examples of suffixes are -tion, -sion, -tive, -ation, -ible, and -ing. Bound morphemes that are not affixed are called cranberry morphemes.

Classification of bound morphemes 
Bound morphemes can be further classified as derivational or inflectional morphemes. The main difference between them is their function in relation to words.

Derivational bound morphemes 
 Derivational morphemes, when combined with a root, change the semantic meaning or the part of speech of the affected word. For example, in the word happiness, the addition of the bound morpheme -ness to the root happy changes the word from an adjective (happy) to a noun (happiness). In the word unkind, un- functions as a derivational morpheme since it inverts the meaning of the root morpheme (word) kind. Generally, morphemes that affix (i.e., affixes) to a root morpheme (word) are bound morphemes.

Inflectional bound morphemes 
 Inflectional morphemes modify the tense, aspect, mood, person, or number of a verb or the number, gender, or case of a noun, adjective, or pronoun without affecting the word's meaning or class (part of speech). Examples of applying inflectional morphemes to words are adding -s to the root dog to form dogs and adding -ed to wait to form waited. An inflectional morpheme changes the form of a word. English has eight inflections.

Allomorphs
Allomorphs are variants of a morpheme that differ in form but are semantically similar. An allomorph is a concrete realization of a morpheme, which is an abstract unit. That is parallel to the relation of an allophone and a phoneme.

Zero-bound-morpheme

Zero-morpheme

A zero-morpheme is a type of morpheme that carries semantic meaning but is not represented by auditory phoneme. A word with a zero-morpheme is analyzed as having the morpheme for grammatical purposes, but the morpheme is not realized in speech. They are often represented by /∅/ within glosses.

Generally, such morphemes have no visible changes. For instance, sheep is both the singular and the plural forms; rather than taking the usual plural suffix -s to form hypothetical *sheeps, the plural is analyzed as being composed of sheep + -∅, the null plural suffix. The intended meaning is thus derived from the co-occurrence determiner (in this case, "some-" or "a-"). 

In some cases, a zero-morpheme may also be used to contrast with other inflected forms of a word that contain an audible morpheme. For example, the plural noun cats in English consists of the root cat and the plural suffix -s, and so the singular cat may be analyzed as the root inflected with the null singular suffix -∅.

Content vs. function
Content morphemes express a concrete meaning or content, and function morphemes have more of a grammatical role. For example, the morphemes fast and sad can be considered content morphemes. On the other hand, the suffix -ed is a function morpheme since it has the grammatical function of indicating past tense.

Both categories may seem very clear and intuitive, but the idea behind them is occasionally more difficult to grasp since they overlap with each other. Examples of ambiguous situations are the preposition over and the determiner your, which seem to have concrete meanings but are considered function morphemes since their role is to connect ideas grammatically. Here is a general rule to determine the category of a morpheme:
 Content morphemes include free morphemes that are nouns, adverbs, adjectives, and verbs and include bound morphemes that are bound roots and derivational affixes.
 Function morphemes may be free morphemes that are prepositions, pronouns, determiners, and conjunctions. They may be bound morphemes that are inflectional affixes.

Other features
Roots are composed of only one morpheme, but stems can be composed of more than one morpheme. Any additional affixes are considered morphemes. For example, in the word quirkiness, the root is quirk, but the stem is quirky, which has two morphemes.

Moreover, some pairs of affixes have identical phonological form but different meanings. For example, the suffix -er can be either derivational (e.g. sell ⇒ seller) or inflectional (e.g. small ⇒ smaller). Such morphemes are called homophonous.

Some words might seem to be composed of multiple morphemes but are not. Therefore, not only form but also meaning must be considered when identifying morphemes. For example, the word Madagascar is long and might seem to have morphemes like mad, gas, and car, but it does not. Conversely, some short words have multiple morphemes (e.g. dogs = dog + s).

Morphological icons 
Morphological icons are images, patterns or symbols that relate to a specific morpheme. For children with dyslexia, it has been shown to be an effective way of building up a word. The word 'inviting' as an example is made up of two commonly used morphemes, 'in-' and '-ing'. A morphological icon for 'in-' could be an arrow going into a cup, and '-ing' could be an arrow going forward to symbolise that something is in action (as in being, running, fishing).

The concept of combining visual aid icons with morpheme teaching methods was pioneered from the mid 1980s by Neville Brown. He founded the Maple Hayes school for dyslexia in 1981, where he later improved the method alongside his son, Daryl Brown. The school's curriculum uses morphological icons as a learning aid.

Morphological analysis 

In natural language processing for Japanese, Chinese, and other languages, morphological analysis is the process of segmenting a sentence into a row of morphemes. Morphological analysis is closely related to part-of-speech tagging, but word segmentation is required for those languages because word boundaries are not indicated by blank spaces.

The purpose of morphological analysis is to determine the minimal units of meaning in a language (morphemes) by comparison of similar forms: such as by comparing forms such as "She is walking" and "They are walking" with each other, rather than either with something less similar like "You are reading." Those forms can be effectively broken down into parts, and the different morphemes can be distinguished.

Both meaning and form are equally important for the identification of morphemes. An agent morpheme is an affix like -er that in English transforms a verb into a noun (e.g. teach → teacher). English also has another morpheme that is identical in pronunciation (and written form) but has an unrelated meaning and function: a comparative morpheme that changes an adjective into another degree of comparison (but remains the same adjective) (e.g. small → smaller). The opposite can also occur: a pair of morphemes with identical meaning but different forms.

Changing definitions

In generative grammar, the definition of a morpheme depends heavily on whether syntactic trees have morphemes as leaves or features as leaves.
 Direct surface-to-syntax mapping in lexical functional grammar (LFG) – leaves are words
 Direct syntax-to-semantics mapping
 Leaves in syntactic trees spell out morphemes: distributed morphology – leaves are morphemes
 Branches in syntactic trees spell out morphemes: radical minimalism and nanosyntax – leaves are "nano-" (small) morpho-syntactic features

Given the definition of a morpheme as "the smallest meaningful unit," nanosyntax aims to account for idioms in which an entire syntactic tree often contributes "the smallest meaningful unit." An example idiom is "Don't let the cat out of the bag." There, the idiom is composed of "let the cat out of the bag." That might be considered a semantic morpheme, which is itself composed of many syntactic morphemes. Other cases of the "smallest meaningful unit" being longer than a word include some collocations such as "in view of" and "business intelligence" in which the words, when together, have a specific meaning.

The definition of morphemes also plays a significant role in the interfaces of generative grammar in the following theoretical constructs:
 Event semantics: the idea that each productive morpheme must have a compositional semantic meaning (a denotation), and if the meaning is there, there must be a morpheme (whether null or overt).
 Spell-out: the interface with which syntactic/semantic structures are "spelled out" by using words or morphemes with phonological content. That can also be thought of as lexical insertion into the syntactic.

See also 
 Alternation (linguistics)
 Bound morpheme
 Floating tone
 Greek morphemes
 Hybrid word
 Morphological parsing
 Morphophonology
 Morphotactics
 Motif-Index of Folk-Literature, featuring a comparable concept in folklore studies
 Phoneme
 Theoretical linguistics
 Word stem

References

External links 

 Glossary of reading terms
 Comprehensive and searchable morpheme reference
 Linguistics 001 —  Lecture 7 —  Morphology by Prof. Mark Lieberman
 Pronunciation of the word morpheme

Units of linguistic morphology
Learning to read
Reading (process)
Linguistics terminology